FC Freienbach is a Swiss football team currently playing in Liga 1.,
the fourth tier in the Swiss football pyramid Group 3.

Based in Freienbach, the club was formed in 1965.

They finished 2020/2021 season in 1st position (2. Liga interregional).

Current squad
As of 1 November, 2021.

External links
 http://www.fc-freienbach.ch 

Association football clubs established in 1965
Freienbach
1965 establishments in Switzerland
Freienbach